Je suis et je resterai is a 2002 album by French singer Leslie.

Track listing
"Intro"
"Est-de ma faute?"
"Je suis et je resterai"
"Pardonner"
"On n'sait jamais (dans la vie)" [featuring Sweety & Magic System]
"Le bon choix"
"Que puis-je y faire?"
"J'Suis pas faite pour a" [featuring Willy Denzey]
"Solo illusiones" [featuring Gulseren]
"Apparences"
"Salis par ces gens (What's Your Name?)" [featuring Med' Allory]
"Vous devez me laisser faire"
"Comme un amour"
"Si seulement" [featuring Little D]
"Annonce-moi la couleur"

Charts

References

2002 albums
Leslie (singer) albums